is a district located in Toyama Prefecture, Japan.

As of October 1, 2016, the district has an estimated population of 49,839 and a density of 91 persons per km2. The total area is 547.55 km2.

Towns and villages
The district has two towns and one village:

 Funahashi
 Kamiichi
 Tateyama

History

District Timeline
 April 1, 1896 - Nakaniikawa District was created from a split within Kaminiikawa District, grouped by 5 towns and 29 villages.

Districts in Toyama Prefecture